Plathymenia  is a genus of solenogaster, a kind of shell-less, worm-like, marine mollusk.

Species
 Plathymenia branchiosa Schwabl, 1961

References

 Schwabl, M. 1961. Plathymenia branchiosa nov. gen., nov. spec., ein neur Vertreter der Neomeniidae aus dem Ostpazifik. Zool. Anz., 167, 3/4:100-115

Solenogastres